In chemistry, isomers are molecules or polyatomic ions with identical molecular formula – that is, same number of atoms of each element – but distinct arrangements of atoms in space. Isomerism is existence or possibility of isomers.

Isomers do not necessarily share similar chemical or physical properties. Two main forms of isomerism are structural or constitutional isomerism, in which bonds between the atoms differ; and stereoisomerism or spatial isomerism, in which the bonds are the same but the relative positions of the atoms differ.

Isomeric relationships form a hierarchy. Two chemicals might be the same constitutional isomer, but upon deeper analysis be stereoisomers of each other. Two molecules that are the same stereoisomer as each other might be in different conformational forms or be different isotopologues. The depth of analysis depends on the field of study or the chemical and physical properties of interest.

The English word "isomer" is a back-formation from "isomeric", which was borrowed through German isomerisch from Swedish ; which in turn was coined from Greek ἰσόμερoς  , with roots  = "equal",   = "part".

Structural isomers

Structural isomers have the same number of atoms of each element (hence the same molecular formula), but the atoms are connected in distinct ways.

Example:  

For example, there are three distinct compounds with the molecular formula C3H8O:

The first two isomers shown of  C3H8O are propanols, that is, alcohols derived from propane.  Both have a chain of three carbon atoms connected by single bonds, with the remaining carbon valences being filled by seven hydrogen atoms and by a hydroxyl group -OH comprising the oxygen atom bound to a hydrogen atom. These two isomers differ on which carbon the hydroxyl is bound to: either to an extremity of the carbon chain propan-1-ol (1-propanol, n-propyl alcohol, n-propanol; I) or to the middle carbon propan-2-ol (2-propanol, isopropyl alcohol, isopropanol; II). These can be described by the condensed structural formulas H3C-CH2-CH2OH and H3C-CH(OH)-CH3.

The third isomer of C3H8O is the ether methoxyethane (ethyl-methyl-ether; III). Unlike the other two, it has the oxygen atom connected to two carbons, and all eight hydrogens bonded directly to carbons. It can be described by the condensed formula H3C-O-CH2-CH3.

The alcohol "3-propanol" is not another isomer, since the difference between it and 1-propanol is not real; it is only the result of an arbitrary choice in the direction of numbering the carbons along the chain.  For the same reason, "ethoxymethane" is the same molecule as methoxyethane, not another isomer.

1-Propanol and 2-propanol are examples of positional isomers, which differ by the position at which certain features, such as double bonds or functional groups, occur on a "parent" molecule (propane, in that case).

Example: 
There are also three structural isomers of the hydrocarbon C3H4:

In two of the isomers, the three carbon atoms are connected in an open chain, but in one of them (propadiene or allene; I) the carbons are connected by two double bonds, while in the other propyne or methylacetylene, II) they are connected by a single bond and a triple bond.  In the third isomer (cyclopropene; III) the three carbons are connected into a ring by two single bonds and a double bond. In all three, the remaining valences of the carbon atoms are satisfied by the four hydrogens.

Again, note that there is only one structural isomer with a triple bond, because the other possible placement of that bond is just drawing the three carbons in a different order. For the same reason, there is only one cyclopropene, not three.

Tautomers
Tautomers are structural isomers which readily interconvert, so that two or more species co-exist in equilibrium such as

H-X-Y=Z <=> X=Y-Z-H.

Important examples are keto-enol tautomerism and the equilibrium between neutral and zwitterionic forms of an amino acid.

Resonance forms
The structure of some molecules is sometimes described as a resonance between several apparently different structural isomers. The classical example is 1,2-dimethylbenzene (o-xylene), which is often described as a mix of the two apparently distinct structural isomers:

However, neither of these two structures describes a real compound; they are fictions devised as a way to describe (by their "averaging" or "resonance") the actual delocalized bonding of o-xylene, which is the single isomer of  C8H10 with a benzene core and two methyl groups in adjacent positions.

Stereoisomers

Stereoisomers have the same atoms or isotopes connected by bonds of the same type, but differ in their shapes – the relative positions of those atoms in space – apart from rotations and translations.

In theory, one can imagine any arrangement in space of the atoms of a molecule or ion to be gradually changed to any other arrangement in infinitely many ways, by moving each atom along an appropriate path. However, changes in the positions of atoms will generally change the internal energy of a molecule, which is determined by the angles between bonds in each atom and by the distances between atoms (whether they are bonded or not).

A conformational isomer is an arrangement of the atoms of the molecule or ion for which the internal energy is a local minimum; that is, an arrangement such that any small changes in the positions of the atoms will increase the internal energy, and hence result in forces that tend to push the atoms back to the original positions. Changing the shape of the molecule from such an energy minimum A to another energy minimum B will therefore require going through configurations that have higher energy than A and B. That is, a conformation isomer is separated from any other isomer by an energy barrier: the amount that must be temporarily added to the internal energy of the molecule in order to go through all the intermediate conformations along the "easiest" path (the one that minimizes that amount).

A classic example of conformational isomerism is cyclohexane.  Alkanes generally have minimum energy when the C-C-C angles are close to 110 degrees. Conformations of the cyclohexane molecule with all six carbon atoms on the same plane have a higher energy, because some or all the C-C-C angles must be far from that value (120 degrees for a regular hexagon). Thus the conformations which are local energy minima have the ring twisted in space, according to one of two patterns known as chair (with the carbons alternately above and below their mean plane) and boat (with two opposite carbons above the plane, and the other four below it).

If the energy barrier between two conformational isomers is low enough, it may be overcome by the random inputs of thermal energy that the molecule gets from interactions with the environment or from its own vibrations.   In that case, the two isomers may as well be considered a single isomer, depending on the temperature and the context.  For example, the two conformations of cyclohexane convert to each other quite rapidly at room temperature (in the liquid state), so that they are usually treated as a single isomer in chemistry.

In some cases, the barrier can be crossed by quantum tunneling of the atoms themselves. This last phenomenon prevents the separation of stereoisomers of fluorochloroamine NHFCl or hydrogen peroxide H2O2, because the two conformations with minimum energy interconvert in a few picoseconds even at very low temperatures.

Conversely, the energy barrier may be so high that the easiest way to overcome it would require temporarily breaking and then reforming one or more bonds of the molecule.  In that case, the two isomers usually are stable enough to be isolated and treated as distinct substances.  These isomers are then said to be different configurational isomers or "configurations" of the molecule, not just two different conformations. (However, one should be aware that the terms "conformation" and "configuration" are largely synonymous outside of chemistry, and their distinction may be controversial even among chemists.)

Interactions with other molecules of the same or different compounds (for example, through hydrogen bonds) can significantly change the energy of conformations of a molecule. Therefore, the possible isomers of a compound in solution or in its liquid and solid phases many be very different from those of an isolated molecule in vacuum. Even in the gas phase, some compounds like acetic acid will exist mostly in the form of dimers or larger groups of molecules, whose configurations may be different from those of the isolated molecule.

Enantiomers
Two compounds are said to be enantiomers if their molecules are mirror images of each other, that cannot be made to coincide only by rotations or translations – like a left hand and a right hand. The two shapes are said to be chiral.

A classical example is bromochlorofluoromethane (CHFClBr). The two enantiomers can be distinguished, for example, by whether the path F->Cl->Br   turns clockwise or counterclockwise as seen from the hydrogen atom. In order to change one conformation to the other, at some point those four atoms would have to lie on the same plane – which would require severely straining or breaking their bonds to the carbon atom.  The corresponding energy barrier between the two conformations is so high that there is practically no conversion between them at room temperature, and they can be regarded as different configurations.

The compound chlorofluoromethane CH2ClF, in contrast, is not chiral: the mirror image of its molecule is also obtained by a half-turn about a suitable axis.

Another example of a chiral compound is 2,3-pentadiene H3C-CH=C=CH-CH3 a hydrocarbon that contains two overlapping double bonds. The double bonds are such that the three middle carbons are in a straight line, while the first three and last three lie on perpendicular planes. The molecule and its mirror image are not superimposable, even though the molecule has an axis of symmetry.  The two enantiomers can be distinguished, for example, by the right-hand rule. This type of isomerism is called axial isomerism.

Enantiomers behave identically in chemical reactions, except when reacted with chiral compounds or in the presence of chiral catalysts, such as most enzymes. For this latter reason, the two enantiomers of most chiral compounds usually have markedly different effects and roles in living organisms. In biochemistry and food science, the two enantiomers of a chiral molecule – such as glucose – are usually identified, and treated as very different substances.

Each enantiomer of a chiral compound typically rotates the plane of polarized light that passes through it. The rotation has the same magnitude but opposite senses for the two isomers, and can be a useful way of distinguishing and measuring their concentration in a solution. For this reason, enantiomers were formerly called "optical isomers". However, this term is ambiguous and is discouraged by the IUPAC.

Stereoisomers that are not enantiomers are called diastereomers. Some diastereomers may contain chiral center, some not.

Some enantiomer pairs (such as those of trans-cyclooctene) can be interconverted by internal motions that change bond lengths and angles only slightly. Other pairs (such as CHFClBr) cannot be interconverted without breaking bonds, and therefore are different configurations.

Cis-trans isomerism
A double bond between two carbon atoms forces the remaining four bonds (if they are single) to lie on the same plane, perpendicular to the plane of the bond as defined by its π orbital. If the two bonds on each carbon connect to different atoms, two distinct conformations are possible, that differ from each other by a twist of 180 degrees of one of the carbons about the double bond.

The classical example is dichloroethene C2H2Cl2, specifically the structural isomer Cl-HC=CH-Cl that has one chlorine bonded to each carbon. It has two conformational isomers, with the two chlorines on the same side or on opposite sides of the double bond's plane. They are traditionally called cis (from Latin meaning "on this side of") and trans ("on the other side of"), respectively; or Z and E in the IUPAC recommended nomenclature.  Conversion between these two forms usually requires temporarily breaking bonds (or turning the double bond into a single bond), so the two are considered different configurations of the molecule.

More generally, cis–trans isomerism (formerly called "geometric isomerism") occurs in molecules where the relative orientation of two distinguishable functional groups is restricted by a somewhat rigid framework of other atoms.

For example, in the cyclic alcohol inositol (CHOH)6 (a six-fold alcohol of cyclohexane), the six-carbon cyclic backbone largely prevents the hydroxyl -OH and the hydrogen -H on each carbon from switching places.  Therefore, one has different configurational isomers depending on whether each hydroxyl is on "this side" or "the other side" of the ring's mean plane.  Discounting isomers that are equivalent under rotations, there are nine isomers that differ by this criterion, and behave as different stable substances (two of them being enantiomers of each other). The most common one in nature (myo-inositol) has the hydroxyls on carbons 1, 2, 3 and 5 on the same side of that plane, and can therefore be called cis-1,2,3,5-trans-4,6-cyclohexanehexol. And each of these cis-trans isomers can possibly have stable "chair" or "boat" conformations (although the barriers between these are significantly lower than those between different cis-trans isomers).

Cis and trans isomers also occur in inorganic coordination compounds, such as square planar MX2Y2 complexes and octahedral MX4Y2 complexes.

For more complex organic molecules, the cis and trans labels are ambiguous. The IUPAC recommends a more precise labeling scheme, based on the CIP priorities for the bonds at each carbon atom.

Centers with non-equivalent bonds
More generally, atoms or atom groups that can form three or more non-equivalent single bonds (such as the transition metals in coordination compounds) may give rise to multiple stereoisomers when different atoms or groups are attached at those positions. The same is true if a center with six or more equivalent bonds has two or more substituents.

For instance, in the compound PF4Cl, the bonds from the phosphorus atom to the five halogens have approximately trigonal bipyramidal geometry. Thus two stereoisomers with that formula are possible, depending on whether the chlorine atom occupies one of the two "axial" positions, or one of the three "equatorial" positions.

For the compound PF3Cl2, three isomers are possible, with zero, one, or two chlorines in the axial positions.

As another example, a complex with a formula like MX3Y3, where the central atom M forms six bonds with octahedral geometry, has at least two facial–meridional isomers, depending on whether the three X bonds (and thus also the three Y bonds) are directed at the three corners of one face of the octahedron (fac isomer), or lie on the same equatorial or "meridian" plane of it (mer isomer).

Rotamers and atropisomers
Two parts of a molecule that are connected by just one single bond can rotate about that bond. While the bond itself is indifferent to that rotation, attractions and repulsions between the atoms in the two parts normally cause the energy of the whole molecule to vary (and possibly also the two parts to deform) depending on the relative angle of rotation φ between the two parts. Then there will be one or more special values of φ for which the energy is at a local minimum. The corresponding conformations of the molecule are called rotational isomers or rotamers.

Thus, for example, in an ethane molecule H3C-CH3, all the bond angles and length are narrowly constrained, except that the two methyl groups can independently rotate about the C-C axis. Thus, even if those angles and distances are assumed fixed, there are infinitely many conformations for the ethane molecule, that differ by the relative angle φ of rotation between the two groups.  The feeble repulsion between the hydrogen atoms in the two methyl groups causes the energy to minimized for three specific values of φ, 120° apart. In those configurations, the six planes H-C-C or C-C-H are 60° apart. Discounting rotations of the whole molecule, that configuration is a single isomer – the so-called staggered conformation.

Rotation between the two halves of the molecule 1,2-dichloroethane (ClH2C-CH2Cl also has three local energy minima, but they have different energies due to differences between the H-H, Cl-Cl, and H-Cl interactions.  There are therefore three rotamers: a trans isomer where the two chlorines are on the same plane as the two carbons, but with oppositely directed bonds; and two gauche isomers, mirror images of each other, where the two -CH2Cl groups are rotated about 109° from that position.  The computed energy difference between trans and gauche is ~1.5 kcal/mol, the barrier for the ~109° rotation from trans to gauche is ~5 kcal/mol, and that of the ~142° rotation from one gauche to its enantiomer is ~8 kcal/mol. The situation for butane is similar, but with sightly lower gauche energies and barriers.

If the two parts of the molecule connected by a single bond are bulky or charged, the energy barriers may be much higher. For example, in the compound biphenyl – two phenyl groups connected by a single bond  – the repulsion between hydrogen atoms closest to the central single bond gives the fully planar conformation, with the two rings on the same plane, a higher energy than conformations where the two rings are skewed.  In the gas phase, the molecule has therefore at least two rotamers, with the ring planes twisted by ±47°, which are mirror images of each other. The barrier between them is rather low (~8 kJ/mol). This steric hindrance effect is more pronounced when those four hydrogens are replaced by larger atoms or groups, like chlorines or carboxyls.  If the barrier is high enough for the two rotamers to be separated as stable compounds at room temperature, they are called atropisomers.

Topoisomers
Large molecules may have isomers that differ by the topology of their overall arrangement in space, even if there is no specific geometric constraint that separate them.  For example, long chains may be twisted to form topologically distinct knots, with interconversion prevented by bulky substituents or cycle closing (as in circular DNA and RNA plasmids). Some knots may come in mirror-image enantiomer pairs. Such forms are called topological isomers or topoisomers.

Also, two or more such molecules may be bound together in a catenane by such topological linkages, even if there is no chemical bond between them.  If the molecules are large enough, the linking may occur in multiple topologically distinct ways, constituting different isomers. Cage compounds, such as helium enclosed in dodecahedrane (He@) and carbon peapods, are a similar type of topological isomerism involving molecules with large internal voids with restricted or no openings.

Isotopes and spin

Isotopomers
Different isotopes of the same element can be considered as different kinds of atoms when enumerating isomers of a molecule or ion. The replacement of one or more atoms by their isotopes can create multiple structural isomers and/or stereoisomers from a single isomer.

For example, replacing two atoms of common hydrogen (^1 H ) by deuterium (^2 H , or D) on an ethane molecule yields two distinct structural isomers, depending on whether the substitutions are both on the same carbon (1,1-dideuteroethane, HD2C-CH3) or one on each carbon (1,2-dideuteroethane, DH2C-CDH2); as if the substituent was chlorine instead of deuterium.  The two molecules do not interconvert easily and have different properties, such as their microwave spectrum.

Another example would be substituting one atom of deuterium for one of the hydrogens in chlorofluoromethane (CH2ClF).  While the original molecule is not chiral and has a single isomer, the substitution creates a pair of chiral enantiomers of CHDClF, which could be distinguished (at least in theory) by their optical activity.

When two isomers would be identical if all isotopes of each element were replaced by a single isotope, they are described as isotopomers or isotopic isomers. In the above two examples if all D were replaced by H, the two dideuteroethanes would both become ethane and the two deuterochlorofluoromethanes would both become CH2ClF.

The concept of isotopomers is different from isotopologs or isotopic homologs, which differ in their isotopic composition. For example, C2H5D and C2H4D2 are isotopologues and not isotopomers, and are therefore not isomers of each other.

Spin isomers
Another type of isomerism based on nuclear properties is spin isomerism, where molecules differ only in the relative spin magnetic quantum numbers ms of the constituent atomic nuclei. This phenomenon is significant for molecular hydrogen, which can be partially separated into two long-lived states described as spin isomers or nuclear spin isomers: parahydrogen, with the spins of the two nuclei pointing in opposite directions, and orthohydrogen, where the spins point in the same direction.

Isomerization

Isomerization is the process by which one molecule is transformed into another molecule that has exactly the same atoms, but the atoms are rearranged. In some molecules and under some conditions, isomerization occurs spontaneously. Many isomers are equal or roughly equal in bond energy, and so exist in roughly equal amounts, provided that they can interconvert relatively freely, that is the energy barrier between the two isomers is not too high. When the isomerization occurs intramolecularly, it is considered a rearrangement reaction.

An example of an organometallic isomerization is the production of decaphenylferrocene, [(η5-C5Ph5)2Fe] from its linkage isomer.

Synthesis of fumaric acid

Industrial synthesis of fumaric acid proceeds via the cis-trans isomerization of maleic acid:

Topoisomerases are enzymes that can cut and reform circular DNA and thus change its topology.

Medicinal chemistry
Isomers having distinct biological properties are common; for example, the placement of methyl groups. In substituted xanthines, theobromine, found in chocolate, is a vasodilator with some effects in common with caffeine; but, if one of the two methyl groups is moved to a different position on the two-ring core, the isomer is theophylline, which has a variety of effects, including bronchodilation and anti-inflammatory action. Another example of this occurs in the phenethylamine-based stimulant drugs. Phentermine is a non-chiral compound with a weaker effect than that of amphetamine. It is used as an appetite-reducing medication and has mild or no stimulant properties. However, an alternate atomic arrangement gives dextromethamphetamine, which is a stronger stimulant than amphetamine.

In medicinal chemistry and biochemistry, enantiomers are a special concern because they may possess distinct biological activity. Many preparative procedures afford a mixture of equal amounts of both enantiomeric forms. In some cases, the enantiomers are separated by chromatography using chiral stationary phases. They may also be separated through the formation of diastereomeric salts. In other cases, enantioselective synthesis have been developed.

As an inorganic example, cisplatin (see structure above) is an important drug used in cancer chemotherapy, whereas the trans isomer (transplatin) has no useful pharmacological activity.

History
Isomerism was first observed in 1827, when Friedrich Wöhler prepared silver cyanate and discovered that, although its elemental composition of AgCNO was identical to silver fulminate (prepared by Justus von Liebig the previous year), its properties were distinct. This finding challenged the prevailing chemical understanding of the time, which held that chemical compounds could be distinct only when their elemental compositions differ. (We now know that the bonding structures of fulminate and cyanate can be approximately described as O- N+≡C- and O=C=N-, respectively.)

Additional examples were found in succeeding years, such as Wöhler's 1828 discovery that urea has the same atomic composition (CH4N2O) as the chemically distinct ammonium cyanate. (Their structures are now known to be (H2N-)2C=O and [NH+4] [O=C=N^ -] , respectively.) In 1830 Jöns Jacob Berzelius introduced the term isomerism to describe the phenomenon.

In 1848, Louis Pasteur observed that tartaric acid crystals came into two kinds of shapes that were mirror images of each other. Separating the crystals by hand, he obtained two version of tartaric acid, each of which would crystallize in only one of the two shapes, and rotated the plane of polarized light to the same degree but in opposite directions. In 1860, Pasteur explicitly hypothesized that the molecules of isomers might have the same composition but different arrangements of their atoms.

See also

 Chirality (chemistry)
 Cis-trans isomerism
 Cyclohexane conformation
 Descriptor (chemistry)
 Electromerism
 Isomery (botany)
 Ligand isomerism
 Nuclear isomer
 Stereocenter
 Structural isomerism
 Tautomer
 Vitamer

References

External links

 
1827 introductions

ga:Isiméir